El Rito in an unincorporated community in Taos County, New Mexico, United States.

References

Unincorporated communities in Taos County, New Mexico
Unincorporated communities in New Mexico